Goldman's spiny pocket mouse (Heteromys goldmani) is a species of rodent in the family Heteromyidae. It has been reported to be a subspecies of Heteromys desmarestianus. It is found in Guatemala and Mexico. Its natural habitat is subtropical or tropical moist lowland forests.

References

Heteromys
Mammals described in 1902
Taxonomy articles created by Polbot
Taxobox binomials not recognized by IUCN